Bhoo is a small village situated in Rajapur Taluka, Ratnagiri district of Maharashtra, India. Its population totals less than 1000. Situated eight kilometres northwest of Rajapur, it is connected to it and to Ratnagiri by bus.

The village is home to betel nut, cashew, jackfruit, coconut and mango gardens.

Its religious centers are dedicated to the Lord Lakshmikant, and Lord Shiva, and kalika devi mandir. There is also a holy temple dedicated to the maiden goddess Shree Aaryadurga approximately three kilometres from Bhoo.  There is a dharamshala (religious rest house) at Aaryadurga. Loknanatya Dashavtar (a folkdrama) is produced by local artists every year.

Languages spoken locally include Marathi, Hindi, and some English.

Due to regularly watered betelnut gardens Bhoo is cool. The astrologer Keshav Padhye (Ved shastrotejak Sabha, Pune Pandit / Scholar) spent his life in this village as deepforesiter. He was a pioneer of cultivating mango gardens, coconut gardens as well as starting a small flour mill and saw mill.

People worship Lord Lakshmikant, kalika Devi and Shankar and goddess Aryadurga.

Khingini, Tervan, Kotapur, Pendkhale are smaller villages around Bhoo.

Acharya Narendra Deo Vidya Mandir is the high school situated in Bhoo. The school has about 400 students and is affiliated with Sane Guruji Shikshan Prasarak Mandal, Janashi. The school is in the Kolhapur Divisional Board for SSC examinations. Some students pursue further education in nearby towns such as Rajapur, Ratnagiri, Kolhapur or in Mumbai.

Transport 

ST buses from Rajapur service the neighbouring villages such as Pendkhale, Satavli (Dasur), Devihasol, Kotapur, Bhalavli and Tervan. The nearest rail station is Rajapur Road, approximately 30 kilometres away. The nearest airport is at Ratnagiri.

References 

Villages in Ratnagiri district